Else Nizigama Ntamagiro became Burundi's Ambassador to Germany and the Vatican in 2016.

Life
Ntamagiro was born in 1972.

Education
Ntamagiro gained her first degree in Administrative and Political Sciences,  in the Democratic Republic of Congo. For her master's degree she went to Belgium. Her master's degree in Political Sciences and International Relations (DEA SPRI) was from the Catholic University of Louvain (UCL)

Career

She began her diplomatic career in 2002 as an adviser to the Ministry of External Relations and also the International Cooperation Department of International Organizations. In 2009 she was appointed as First Counsellor at her country's embassy in the Democratic Republic of Congo.

Ntamagiro has had several other ambassadorial level posts including Ambassador to the Russian Federation and to Georgia (2014-2016) and Chargé d'Affaires at the Embassy of Burundi in Canada from 2011 until 2013.

She was appointed as her country's Ambassador to Germany on the 6 July 2016 with a co-accreditation to the Vatican (since December 15, 2016), Austria (since January 8, 2018), Slovakia (since January 17, 2018) and the United Nations Industrial Development Organization since June 23, 2017.

References

Ambassadors of Burundi to Austria
Ambassadors of Burundi to Germany
Women ambassadors
Ambassadors of Burundi to the Holy See
Ambassadors of Burundi to Slovakia
United Nations Industrial Development Organization people
Ambassadors of Burundi to Canada
Ambassadors of Burundi to Russia
Ambassadors of Burundi to Georgia (country)
Université catholique de Louvain alumni
Burundian diplomats
1972 births
Living people